Jarai people or Jarais (or ;) are an Austronesian indigenous people and ethnic group native to Vietnam's Central Highlands (Gia Lai and Kon Tum Provinces, with smaller populations in Đắk Lắk Province), as well as in the Cambodian northeast Province of Ratanakiri. During the Vietnam War, many Jarai persons, as well as members of other Montagnard groups (Khmer Loeu and Degar), worked with US Special Forces, and many were resettled with their families in the United States, particularly in North Carolina, after the war.

The Jarai language is a member of the Malayo-Polynesian branch of the Austronesian language family.  It is related to the Cham language of central Vietnam and Cambodia and the Malayo-Polynesian languages of Indonesia, Malaysia, Madagascar, Philippines and other Pacific Islands such as Hawaii and New Zealand. There are approximately 332,558 Jarai speakers. They are the largest of the upland ethnic groups of the Central Highlands known as Degar or Montagnards and they make up 23% of the population of Ratanakiri Province in Cambodia. Both groups, the Cambodian and Vietnamese Jarai, share the same traditions and keep a close relation of cultural interchange, but their language gets the influence of their respectively Khmer and Vietnamese linguistic environment. A few of khmer Jarai words are borrowed from Khmer and Lao. While trading conversation between Khmer Jarai and Vietnamese Jarai, there can be some perplexity among them. Vietnamese Jarai has a written form in Latin script, but Khmer Jarai does not.

Name 

The word Jarai (ចារ៉ាយ - Charay) means "People of the Waterfalls or People of the Flowing River".

Origins 
Studies about the Jarai people and their culture have mainly focused on their language and were made by evangelical groups seeking conversions. Linguistically, they are related to the Malayo-Polynesian language. There are no known ancient records of Jarai people in the area. The first reports come from the French colony during the 19th century that demarcated the border between Vietnam and Cambodia, dividing the Jarai territory and letting a small portion in what is today Ratanakiri Province.

The Jarai People have inhabited the region of what is today the Vietnamese provinces of Gia Lai, Kon Tum and Đắk Lắk and the Cambodian Ratanakiri Province for many centuries.  Research is needed on specifics such as dates and geographical movement.

Being part of the Zomia Region that include all highlander indigenous peoples along the range mountains from the Tibet Plateau to all the northern areas of the Indochina Peninsula, it is possible that the Jarai belong to a very ancient migration from the west and central areas of Asia. In a DNA test to some Jarai students in Cambodia in 2017, they presented evidences of belonging to the Haplogroup T-M184 that originates more than 25 thousand years ago at the Mediterranean Basin.

The studies of the Jarai language since the middle of the 19th century, found that Jarai is related to Thiames (Chams) and Rade languages of the ancient kingdom of Champa, putting the ancestors of the Jarai in the Malayo origins and Chamic languages.

The modern Jarai people can be divided in six subgroups, the last one in Cambodia:

 Jarai Chor.
 Jarai Hdrung.
 Jarai Arap.
 Jarai Mthur
 Jarai Tbuan.
 Jarai Khmer also bilingual in Tampuan language.

History 

The highland regions of the north of Indochina were settled by humans somewhere between the later Stone Age (Neolithic) and the Bronze Age, 10,000 years ago. The Jarai people have experienced waves of colonization attempts from earlier Han Chinese invasions, to later French colonization, to current majority Vietnamese continued repression.

Sa Huỳnh culture 

The Sa Huỳnh culture was a culture in modern-day central and southern Vietnam and Philippines that flourished between 1000 BC and 200 AD. Archaeological sites from the culture have been discovered from the Mekong Delta to Quang Binh province in central Vietnam. The Sa Huynh people were most likely the predecessors of the Cham people, an Austronesian-speaking people and the founders of the kingdom of Champa.

Champa 

The term Champa refers to a collection of independent Cham polities that extended across the coast of what is today central and southern Vietnam from approximately the 2nd century through 19th century (1832), before being absorbed and annexed by the Vietnamese state. The destruction of Champa caused the spread of different tribes in the regions of what is today Vietnam, Laos and Cambodia sharing the same linguistic root like the Jarai People.

Highlanders 

Trades between highlanders and lowlanders living around the Gulf of Thailand happened around the 4th century A.C., but there were also raids led by Khmer, Lao and Thai slave traders. The region where the Jarai people live today, was conquered by Lao rulers during the 18th century, then by Thai during the 19th. The region was incorporated to the French Indochina colony in 1893 and the slave trade was abolished, but indigenous peoples were used for the huge rubber plantations. The French contributed to the delimitation of territories inside their Indochina colonies of Cambodia, Vietnam and Lao. The Jarai people were mostly divided between Cambodia (a small part of their territory inside Ratanakiri) and Vietnam Central Highlands, although another theory said that Jarai people moved into the Cambodian territory during the colonial times, but it is probably that they have inhabited the whole territories for centuries.

Contact with the West 

The first Western report about the Jarai comes from Fr. Bouillevaux, a French missionary that made an incursion through the Mekong in 1850 and mentioned about certain "King of Fire", a man of respect belonging to a certain group of people called Jarai.

The French rulers did not interfere too much with the highland indigenous groups, but considered them an excellent source of personnel for army outposts and recruited large number of Jarai, Khmer Loeu and Degar young men to French forces.

Vietnamese War 

After the Independence, Cambodian and Vietnamese governments led programs to teach indigenous peoples their respectively languages and assimilate them into their national societies, but such efforts were met with cultural resistance from most indigenous communities. In Cambodia, the Khmer Rouge guerrillas took advantage of that disaffection and recruited many Khmer Loeu in their ranks, while in Vietnam, the US army retook the French tradition to recruit them into military activities in which many Jarai youth participated. It made the Jarai and many other indigenous groups target of other enemies. In 1977 a number of 100 Jarai men were tortured and executed by Khmer Rouge cadres in Ratanakiri in a case filed at the Khmer Rouge Tribunal.

During the Vietnam War, Jarai villages suffered the struggle between US military and communist guerrilla. By 31 October 1970, US military ordered a massive resettlement of highlander villages saying that they were "insecure". At the same time, US Evangelists entered in contact with Jarai people and published Bibles in their language (excluding the Khmer Jarai). The Jarai Bibles created some literacy to them, but after the Vietnamese reunification in 1975, most of the Jarai assistants of the US military, were evacuated from their land to United States. The Khmer Jarai suffered the intense US bombing of their territory in what was called Operation Menu (1969-1970) with the intention to destroy communist sanctuaries, but displacing hundreds of civilians and indigenous peoples that eventually joined the Khmer Rouge.

The Khmer Rouge kept attempting to incorporate Khmer Loeu peoples in their fights against the Vietnamese and Cambodian central government after its defeat in 1979, but in 1984 there was a campaign to integrate indigenous peoples into the nation, promoting literacy and creating government structures similar to the rest of the country. In Vietnam, the Jarai people has suffered under restrictions of religious parties, making that some of them preferred to emigrate.

In the 1950s and 1960s the Degar movement gained popularity among the Jarai and their Montagnard brethren (Degar is a Rhade word meaning "sons of the mountain"). The goal of the Degar was to create an independent state in the Vietnamese highlands, consisting entirely of indigenous people groups. As a result of the movement, the Vietnamese government has become increasingly suspicious of the Jarai. Human rights abuses on the part of the government have become frequent among all Montagnards.

Modern times 

In modern times, Jarai people suffered from colonization, land eviction and land grabbing, especially in Cambodia under a big system of corruption and the deforestation to create huge rubber plantations. Although Cambodia has laws to respect and protect the indigenous territories, the law is not applied and powerful individuals and groups profit evict the Jarai communities from their ancestral lands. In Vietnam, some Jarai persons seek for refuge in other countries, crossing the Cambodian territory to escape restrictions of their traditions and cultures.

Legends 

Jarai people has several legends, all settled on the jungles, that are useful to understand their own culture and history. A recurrent element has to see with the stories about three kings: Fire, Water and Wind and a Sacred Sword that came down from heaven to give to the Jarai people great powers. The King of Fire, the first one, lives in Vietnam relying his power in religious rites. Jarai means "waterfall" and thus water makes a part of their relates. Some elders say that Jarai people were born at the Annamite Range and migrated to the south dividing in different groups.

Culture

Villages 

Traditionally, the Jarai live in small villages numbering 50-500 in population. The villages are laid out in a square, with single occupancy dwellings or communal longhouses (roong) arranged around a village center. Often the village centre has a communal house, well, volleyball net and rice mill.

Houses are made of bamboo, one metre above the ground. More durable wooden houses with steel roofs have gained popularity. They are oriented from north to south and built in a place acceptable to the local spirits. Houses are set up according to matrilineal clan. A daughter, when married, lives in the house of her mother with her husband and thus her own daughter. A house can be as long as 50 metres. Homes for just the nuclear family are also common in modern times.

Small generators are used widely in Jarai Ratanakiri villages where there is no electricity. Traditional furnishings include benches and kitchen objects crafted from wood and bamboo and modern additions are now found, including beds and TVs.

Wedding 

Jarai is a matrilineal culture tracing the descent through the female line and identifying each person with their matriline lineage, which can involve the inheritance of property and/or titles. The mother is the one to take the initiative of the marriage of her daughters and the husband is expected to come to live in the house of his mother-in-law. The intermarriage with persons of other ethnic groups can be common, especially if there is a proximity of villages. In Ratanakiri Province, Jarai people intermarriage especially with the Tampuan people, an unrelated group of Mon-Khmer language family. With the access of many Jarai young people to education in bigger towns or cities like Phnom Penh or Ho Chi Minh City, intermarriage with other ethnic groups is increasing, creating multilingual families.

Religion 

The traditional religion of Jarai is Animism. They believe that objects, places and creatures possess distinctive spiritual qualities. The Jarai Animism has two main elements: the idea that the Jarai people received the Sacred Sword from Heaven that means wisdom and the spiritual figure of the King of Fire, King of Water and King of Wind. The kings do not represent political figures, but they are rather spiritual leaders with shamanic powers. The Jarai kings attract even persons from other ethnic groups that believe in their influences over the mysteries of the human nature and the souls of all living things. The Jarai Animism is strictly linked to the jungle and it includes animal sacrifices to appease the spirits.

As it happens with most Animist faiths, other religions like Christianity or Islam look down on them, and considering it as savage or demonic belief and sponsored their missionaries to spend time and resources to learn their language in order to convert them to their own beliefs and thus making a process of what they considered civilizing others and thus destroying their heritages.

The Vietnamese Reunification in 1975 under the Communist regime of Hanoi meant religious restrictions for many people in the country, affecting the ancestral religious traditions of the Vietnamese Jarai. Vietnam allows only six official religions to be practiced in the country and Jarai Animism is one of those excluded. This has motivated some Jarai to seek for refuge in foreign countries.

At the same time, the incursion of US Evangelists during Vietnam War, like the American missionaries under the Christian and Missionary Alliance make use of this opportunity to convert many of them. The publication of a Jarai Bible in Vietnam was a part of that process.

In Cambodia, Jarai People live together with the Khmer population whom majority of them embrace Theravada Buddhism. The fact that Theravada Buddhism does not organised any form of aggressive missionary conversions onto other peoples and that Southeast Asian Buddhism is very respectful to other religions like Animism similar to the one of Jarai and Brahmanism, thus creates a peaceful and harmony relationship between the two communities. Some Jarai people in Ratanakiri include Buddhist symbols in their rites and houses and participate in Buddhist ceremonies with their Khmer neighbors, although there is no Buddhist Cetiya in Jarai villages.

Music and dance 

Music and dance are very distinctive elements of the Jarai culture. The Jarai nights in the villages or inside the house clan are animated by their ancestral music performs with gongs, xylophones such as t'rưng, zithers, mouth fiddle k'ni, and various other traditional instruments, many of them made of wood and bamboo. The Jarai Trova is a composition improvised by the musician in which he tells the challenges of the daily life of the Jarai people while the clan drinks the Srah Phien (jar liqueur) made of fermented rice. It is the moment where children learn ancient stories of the jungles and the ancestral values of the Jarai culture. The music and dance are monotonous and nostalgic, creating a close relation with the jungle, the natural environment of the people.

In 1996 Dock Rmah, a prominent Jarai musician living in the United States, received a Folk Heritage Award from the North Carolina Arts Council.

Funeral traditions 

Traditional Jarai tombs are little huts in which are placed the possessions of the deceased and some offerings. Around the tomb are placed wooden pillars which are topped by crude carvings, some of which represent spiritual guardians.

The burial ceremony is extremely expensive and usually entails the sacrifice of water buffaloes and cows. In Ratanakiri, Jarai people are replacing the sacrifice of large animals with large objects, such as motorcycles. Some deceased persons are buried with their motorbike. If the family of the deceased cannot afford the ceremony, it can be postponed for several years.

After a number of years, the tombs are abandoned. This final ceremony of the abandonment of the tomb marks the point where death becomes final and the deceased spirit is released, thus releasing a widow for remarriage for instance.

Language and writing system 

The Jarai language has been classified since 1864 as a Western Malayo-Polynesian Malayic, Achinese-Chamic, Chamic, South, Plateau identified by M. Fontaine as related to the languages of the Thiames (Chams) and Rade of the ancient kingdom of Champa, today the province of Annam.

The division of the Jarai people between two countries (Cambodia and Vietnam), creates a progressive development of two distinctive Jarai linguistic groups: Cambodian Jarai and Vietnamese Jarai, the latter uses the Latin Vietnamese script, while Cambodian Jarai remains without a writing system.

See also

 Jarai language
 Degar
 Thủy Xá and Hỏa Xá
 Khmer Leu
 List of ethnic groups in Vietnam
 Demographics of Vietnam
 Kok Ksor

References

External links
Dock Rmah page at North Carolina Arts Council site
Ethnologue report for Jarai language
The Far East - Cambodia
 50-page document from "DA Pam No. 550-105 Ethnographic Study Series Minority Groups in the Republic of Vietnam  (February 1966) in the United States Armed Forces Manuals Collection @ The Vietnam Center and Archive
 "Ethnographic Study Series: Selected Groups in the Republic of Vietnam, the Jarai" (69 pages) (October 1965) in the John Campbell Collection (USOM/Office of Rural Affairs, Saigon) @ The Vietnam Center and Archive.

 
Cham
Ethnic groups in Cambodia
Ethnic groups in Vietnam
Kon Tum province
Ratanakiri province